Scenery and Fish is the second album by the Canadian rock band I Mother Earth, released by Capitol and EMI in 1996. It is the band's most commercially successful album, going double platinum in Canada. By April 1999, the album had sold 320,000 units in Canada.

The album was somewhat of a continuance of the band's percussive, psychedelic sound, albeit this time with more of a post-grunge twist tinged with elements of both progressive rock and pop.

Personnel
Edwin – vocals
Jagori Tanna – guitars, backing vocals
Bruce Gordon – bass
Christian Tanna – drums

Additional musicians
Alex Lifeson – additional guitar on "Like A Girl"
Luis Conte – percussion
Daniel Mansilla – percussion
Kenny Pearson – Hammond B3 organ

Track listing
(All songs written by "I Mother Earth", later revealed to be Jagori and Christian Tanna)

References

1996 albums
I Mother Earth albums
Capitol Records albums
EMI Records albums
Albums recorded at Le Studio